Carpenter ants (Camponotus spp.) are large ants indigenous to many forested parts of the world.

They build nests inside wood consisting of galleries chewed out with their mandibles or jaws, preferably in dead, damp wood. However, unlike termites, they do not consume wood, discarding a material that resembles sawdust outside their nest. Sometimes, carpenter ants hollow out sections of trees. They also commonly infest wooden buildings and structures, and are a widespread problem and major cause of structural damage. Nevertheless, their ability to excavate wood helps in forest decomposition. The genus includes over 1,000 species. They also farm aphids. In their farming, the ants protect the aphids from predators (usually other insects) while they excrete a sugary fluid called honeydew, which the ants get by stroking the aphids with their antennae.

Description 
Camponotus are generally large ants, with workers being 4-7 mm long in small species or 7-13 mm in large species, queens being 9-20 mm long and males being 5-13 mm long.  The bases of the antennae are separated from the clypeal border by a distance of at least the antennal scape's maximum diameter. The mesosoma in profile usually forms a continuous curve from the pronotum through to the propodeum.

Habitat

Carpenter ant species reside both outdoors and indoors in moist, decaying, or hollow wood, most commonly in forest environments.  They cut "galleries" into the wood grain to provide passageways to allow for movement between different sections of the nest. Certain parts of a house, such as around and under windows, roof eaves, decks and porches, are more likely to be infested by carpenter ants because these areas are most vulnerable to moisture.

Carpenter ants have been known to construct extensive underground tunneling systems. These systems often lead to an end at some food source – often aphid colonies, where the ants extract and feed on honeydew. These tunneling systems also often exist in trees. The colonies typically include a central "parent" colony surrounded and supplemented by smaller satellite colonies.

Food

Carpenter ants are considered both predators and scavengers. These ants are foragers that typically eat parts of other dead insects or substances derived from other insects. Common foods for them include insect parts, "honeydew" produced by aphids, or extrafloral nectar from plants. They are also known for eating other sugary liquids such as honey, syrup, or juices. Carpenter ants can increase the survivability of aphids when they tend them. They tend many aphid species but can also express preference for specific ones.

Most species of carpenter ants forage at night. When foraging, they usually collect and consume dead insects. Some species less commonly collect live insects. When they discover a dead insect, workers surround it and extract its bodily fluids to be carried back to the nest. The remaining chitin-based shell is left behind. Occasionally, the ants bring the chitinous head of the insect back to the nest, where they also extract its inner tissue.  The ants can forage individually or in small or large groups, though they often opt to do so individually. Different colonies in close proximity may have overlapping foraging regions, although they typically do not assist each other in foraging. Their main food sources normally include proteins and carbohydrates.
Instances of carpenter ants bleeding Chinese elm trees for the sap have been observed in the northern Arizona region. These instances may be rare as the colonies vastly exceeded the standard size of carpenter ant colonies elsewhere.
When workers find food sources, they communicate this information to the rest of the nest. They use biochemical pheromones to mark the shortest path that can be taken from the nest to the source. When a sizable number of workers follows this trail, the strength of the cue increases and a foraging trail is established. This ends when the food source is depleted. The workers will then feed the queen and the larvae by consuming the food they have found, and regurgitating (trophallaxis) the food at the nest. Foraging trails can either be under or above ground.

Although carpenter ants do not tend to be extremely aggressive, they have developed mechanisms to maximize their provision from a food source when that same food source is visited by a competing organism. This is accomplished in different ways. Sometimes they colonize an area near a relatively static food supply. More often, they develop a systemic way to visit the food source with alternating trips by different individual ants or groups.  This allows them to decrease the gains of intruders because the intruders tend to visit in a scattered, random, and unorganized manner. The ants, however, visit the sources systematically such that they lower the mean standing crop. They tend to visit more resource-dense food areas in an attempt to minimize resource availability for others. That is, the more systematic the foraging behavior of the ants, the more random that of its competitors.

Contrary to popular belief, carpenter ants do not actually eat wood because they are unable to digest cellulose. They only create tunnels and nests within it.

Some carpenter ant species can obtain nitrogen by feeding on urine or urine-stained sand. This may be beneficial in nitrogen-limited environments.

Symbionts
All ants in this genus, and some related genera, possess an obligate bacterial endosymbiont called Blochmannia. This bacterium has a small genome, and retains genes to biosynthesize essential amino acids and other nutrients. This suggests the bacterium plays a role in ant nutrition. Many Camponotus species are also infected with Wolbachia, another endosymbiont that is widespread across insect groups. Wolbachia is associated with the nurse cells in the queen's ovaries in the species Camponotus textor, which results in the worker larva being infected.

Behavior and ecology

Nesting

Carpenter ants work to build the nests that house eggs in environments with usually high humidity due to their sensitivity to environmental humidity. These nests are called primary nests. Satellite nests are constructed once the primary nest is established and has begun to mature. Residents of satellite nests include older larvae, pupae, and some winged individuals. Only eggs, the newly hatched larvae, workers, and the queen reside in the primary nests. As satellite nests do not have environmentally sensitive eggs, the ants can construct them in rather diverse locations that can actually be relatively dry. Some species, like Camponotus vagus, build the nest in a dry place, usually in wood.

Nuptial flight
When conditions are warm and humid, winged males and females participate in a nuptial flight. They emerge from their satellite nests and females mate with a number of males while in flight. The males die after mating. These newly fertilized queens discard their wings and search for new areas to establish primary nests. The queens build new nests and deposit around 20 eggs, nurturing them as they grow until worker ants emerge. The worker ants eventually assist her in caring for the brood as she lays more eggs. After a few years, reproductive winged ants are born, allowing for the making of new colonies. Again, satellite nests will be established and the process will repeat itself.

Relatedness
Relatedness is the probability that a gene in one individual is an identical copy, by descent, of a gene in another individual. It is essentially a measure of how closely related two individuals are with respect to a gene. It is quantified by the coefficient of relatedness, which is a number between zero and one. The larger the value, the more two individuals are "related". Carpenter ants are social hymenopteran insects. This means the relatedness between offspring and parents is disproportionate. Females are more closely related to their sisters than they are to their offspring. Between full sisters, the coefficient of relatedness is r > 0.75 (due to their haplodiploid genetic system). Between parent and offspring, the coefficient of relatedness is r = 0.5, because, given the event in meiosis,  a certain gene has a 50% chance of  being passed on to the offspring. The level of relatedness is an important dictator of individual interactions.

Genetic diversity
Eusocial insects tend to present low genetic diversity within colonies, which can increase with the co-occurrence of multiple queens (polygyny) or with multiple mating by a single queen (polyandry). Distinct reproductive strategies may generate similar patterns of genetic diversity in ants.

Kin recognition
According to Hamilton's rule for relatedness, for relative-specific interactions to occur, such as kin altruism, a high level of relatedness is necessary between two individuals. Carpenter ants, like many social insect species, have mechanisms by which individuals determine whether others are nestmates or not. They are useful because they explain the presence or absence of altruistic behavior between individuals. They also act as evolutionary strategies to help prevent incest and promote kin selection. Social carpenter ants recognize their kin in many ways. These methods of recognition are largely chemical in nature, and include environmental odors, pheromones, "transferable labels", and labels from the queen that are distributed to and among nest members. Because they have a chemical basis for emission and recognition, odors are useful because many ants can detect such changes in their environment through their antennae. This allows acceptance of nestmates and rejection of non-nestmates.

The process of recognition for carpenter ants requires two events. First, a cue must be present on a "donor animal". These cues are called "labels". Next, the receiving animal must be able to recognize and process the cue. In order for an individual carpenter ant to be recognized as a nestmate, it must, as an adult, go through specific interactions with older members of the nest. This process is also necessary in order for the ant to recognize and distinguish other individuals. If these interactions do not occur in the beginning of adult life, the ant will be unable to be distinguished as a nestmate and unable to distinguish nestmates.

Kin altruism
Recognition allows for the presence of kin-specific interactions, such as kin altruism. Altruistic individuals increase other individuals' fitness at the expense of their own. Carpenter ants perform altruistic actions toward their nestmates so that their shared genes are propagated more readily or more often. In many social insect species like these ants, many worker animals are sterile and do not have the ability to reproduce. As a result, they forgo reproduction to donate energy and help the fertile individuals reproduce.

Pheromones
As in most other social insect species, individual interaction is heavily influenced by the queen. The queen can influence individuals with odors called pheromones, which can have different effects. Some pheromones have been known to calm workers, while others have been known to excite them. Pheromonal cues from ovipositing queens have a stronger effect on worker ants than those of virgin queens.

Social immunity
In many social insect species, social behavior can increase the disease resistance of animals. This phenomenon, called social immunity, exists in carpenter ants. It is mediated through the feeding of other individuals by regurgitation. The regurgitate can have antimicrobial activity, which would be spread amongst members of the colony. Some proteases with antimicrobial activity have been found to exist in regurgitated material. Communal sharing of immune response capability is likely to play a large role in colonial maintenance during highly pathogenic periods.

Polygyny
Polygyny often is associated with many social insect species, and usually is characterized by limited mating flights, small queen size, and other characteristics.  However, carpenter ants have "extensive" mating flights and relatively large queens, distinguishing them from polygynous species. Carpenter ants are described as oligogynous because they have a number of fertile queens which are intolerant of each other and must therefore spread to different areas of the nest. Some aggressive interactions have been known to take place between queens, but not necessarily through workers. Queens become aggressive mainly to other queens if they trespass on a marked territory. Queens in a given colony can work together in brood care and the workers tend to experience higher rates of survival in colonies with multiple queens. Some researchers still subscribe to the notion that carpenter ant colonies are only monogynous.

Exploding ants

In at least nine Southeast Asian species of the Cylindricus complex, including Camponotus saundersi, workers feature greatly enlarged mandibular glands that run the entire length of the ant's body. They can release their contents suicidally by performing autothysis, thereby rupturing the ant's body and spraying toxic substance from the head, which gives these species the common name "exploding ants". The enlarged mandibular gland, which is many times the size of that of a normal ant, produces a glue. The glue bursts out and entangles and immobilizes all nearby victims.

The termite species Globitermes sulphureus has a similar defensive system.

Selected species

 Camponotus aeneopilosus Mayr, 1862 – golden tail sugar ant
 Camponotus amaurus (Espadaler, 1997)
 Camponotus americanus
 Camponotus anderseni
 Camponotus atriceps – Florida carpenter ant (cf. C. floridanus)
 Camponotus bishamon
 Camponotus chromaiodes – red carpenter ant
 Camponotus cinctellus – shiny sugar ant
 Camponotus compressus (Fabricius, 1787)
 Camponotus consobrinus – banded sugar ant
 Camponotus crassus Mayr, 1862
 Camponotus cruentatus (Latreille, 1802)
 Camponotus daitoensis
 Camponotus detritus Emery, 1886 – Namib Desert dune ant
 Camponotus empedocles – glossy sugar ant
 Camponotus fellah (Dalla Torre, 1983)
 Camponotus ferrugineus – red carpenter ant
 Camponotus festinatus (Buckley, 1866)
 Camponotus flavomarginatus Mayr, 1862
 Camponotus floridanus, Florida carpenter ant, genome 90% sequenced
 Camponotus haroi (Espadaler, 1997)
 Camponotus herculeanus (Linnaeus, 1758) – Hercules ant
 Camponotus japonicus Mayr, 1866 – Japanese carpenter ant
 Camponotus kaura
 Camponotus ligniperda, a common species in Europe
 Camponotus modoc Wheeler, W. M., 1910 – western carpenter ant
 Camponotus monju
 Camponotus nearcticus (Emery) – smaller carpenter ant
 Camponotus nigriceps (Smith, 1858) – black-headed sugar ant
 Camponotus novaeboracensis
 Camponotus pennsylvanicus (DeGeer) – black carpenter ant
 Camponotus reburrus Mackay, in Mackay & Barriga, 2012
 Camponotus punctulatus (Mayr) – Tacuru ant
 Camponotus saundersi
 Camponotus schmitzi Stärke, 1933 – diving ant
 Camponotus sericeiventris
 Camponotus sericeus
 Camponotus silvestrii Emery, 1906
 Camponotus taino
 Camponotus tortuganus (Emery) – Tortugas carpenter ant
 Camponotus triodiae
 Camponotus universitatis Forel, 1890
 Camponotus vagus Scopoli, 1763
 Camponotus variegatus (Smith, F., 1858) – Hawaiian carpenter ant

Relationship with humans
One of the most familiar species associated with human habitation in the United States is the black carpenter ant (Camponotus pennsylvanicus).

As pests
Carpenter ants can damage wood used in the construction of buildings. They can leave behind a sawdust-like material called frass that provides clues to their nesting location. Carpenter ant galleries are smooth and very different from termite-damaged areas, which have mud packed into the hollowed-out areas. Carpenter ants can be identified by the general presence of one upward protruding node, looking like a spike, at the "waist" attachment between the thorax and abdomen (petiole). Control involves application of insecticides in various forms including dusts and liquids. The dusts are injected directly into galleries and voids where the carpenter ants are living. The liquids are applied in areas where foraging ants are likely to pick the material up and spread the poison to the colony upon returning.

As food

Carpenter ants and their larvae are eaten in various parts of the world. In Australia, the Honeypot ant (Camponotus inflatus) is regularly eaten raw by Indigenous Australians. It is a particular favourite source of sugar for Australian Aborigines living in arid regions, partially digging up their nests instead of digging them up entirely, in order to preserve this food source. In North America, lumbermen during the early years in Maine would eat carpenter ants to prevent scurvy, and in John Muir's publication, First Summer in the Sierra, Muir notes that the Northern Paiute people of California ate the tickling, acid gasters of the large jet-black carpenter ants. In Africa, carpenter ants are among a vast number of species that are consumed by the San people.

References

Cited texts

Further reading
  (1861): Die europäischen Formiciden. Vienna. PDF—original description of p. 35
  (2007): A Key to Camponotus Mayr of Australia. In: Snelling, R.R., B.L. Fisher and P.S. Ward (eds). Advances in ant systematics (Hymenoptera: Formicidae): homage to E. O. Wilson – 50 years of contributions. Memoirs of the American Entomological Institute 80. PDF — 91 species, 10 subspecies

External links 

 Carpenter Ant Information
 University of Kentucky Extension Fact Sheet
 Ohio State University Extension Fact Sheet
 Carpenter Ant Fact Sheet from the National Pest Management Association with information on habits, habitat and prevention
 Carpenter Ants An online supplemental to "Carpenter Ants: Biology and Control" by Laurel Hansen, Ph.D. of Spokane Falls Community College

 
Ant genera
Taxa named by Gustav Mayr